Pirates of the Caribbean is an American fantasy supernatural swashbuckler film series produced by Jerry Bruckheimer and based on Walt Disney's theme park attraction of the same name. The film series serves as a major component of the eponymous media franchise.

Directors of the series include Gore Verbinski (films 1–3), Rob Marshall (4), Joachim Rønning (5–6), and Espen Sandberg (5). The series is primarily written by Ted Elliott and Terry Rossio (1–4); other writers include Stuart Beattie (1), Jay Wolpert (1), Jeff Nathanson (5), and Craig Mazin (6). 

The stories follow the adventures of Captain Jack Sparrow (Johnny Depp), Will Turner (Orlando Bloom) and Elizabeth Swann (Keira Knightley), with Hector Barbossa (Geoffrey Rush) and Joshamee Gibbs (Kevin McNally) following over the course of the films. Other characters featured in the original trilogy include James Norrington (Jack Davenport), Pintel (Lee Arenberg), Ragetti (Mackenzie Crook), Marty (Martin Klebba), Cotton (David Bailie), Murtogg and Mullroy (Giles New & Angus Barnett), Bootstrap Bill Turner (Stellan Skarsgård), Lord Cutler Beckett (Tom Hollander), Governor Swann (Jonathan Pryce), Tia Dalma (Naomie Harris), and Davy Jones (Bill Nighy). 

The fourth film features Angelica (Penélope Cruz), Blackbeard (Ian McShane), Philip Swift (Sam Claflin), and Syrena (Àstrid Bergès-Frisbey), and Scrum (Stephen Graham). The fifth film features Armando Salazar (Javier Bardem), Henry Turner (Brenton Thwaites) and Carina Smyth (Kaya Scodelario) among the aforementioned characters. The films take place in a fictionalized version of the Golden Age of Piracy, and are set primarily in the Caribbean.

The film series started in 2003 with Pirates of the Caribbean: The Curse of the Black Pearl, which had a positive reception from audiences and film critics. It grossed US$654 million worldwide. After the first film's success, Walt Disney Pictures announced that a film series was in the works. The franchise's second film, subtitled Dead Man's Chest, was released in 2006 and broke financial records worldwide the day of its premiere. Dead Man's Chest became the top-grossing movie of 2006 with almost US$1.1 billion at the worldwide box office. The third film in the series, subtitled At World's End, followed in 2007 earning US$960 million. Disney released a fourth film, subtitled On Stranger Tides, in 2011 in conventional 2D, Digital 3-D and IMAX 3D. On Stranger Tides succeeded in also grossing more than $1 billion, becoming the second film in the franchise and only the eighth film in history to do this, at the time of release. A fifth film, subtitled Dead Men Tell No Tales, was released in 2017.

The franchise has grossed over $4.5 billion worldwide; it is the 15th-highest-grossing film series of all time, and is the first film franchise to produce two or more movies that grossed over $1 billion.

Films

Pirates of the Caribbean: The Curse of the Black Pearl (2003) 

Blacksmith Will Turner teams up with eccentric pirate Captain Jack Sparrow to save Turner's love, Elizabeth Swann, from cursed pirates led by Jack's mutinous former first mate, Hector Barbossa. Jack wants revenge against Barbossa, who left him stranded on an island before stealing his ship, the Black Pearl, along with 882 pieces of cursed Aztec Gold.

Pirates of the Caribbean: Dead Man's Chest (2006) 

Lord Cutler Beckett of the East India Trading Company arrests Will and Elizabeth for aiding Captain Jack Sparrow in the previous film. Beckett offers clemency if Will agrees to search for Jack's compass in a bid to find the Dead Man's Chest—and inside, the heart of villainous Davy Jones—which would give Beckett control of the seas. However, Jack wants the Chest to escape from an unpaid debt with Jones, who made Jack captain of the Black Pearl for 13 years in exchange for 100 years of service aboard Jones' ship, the Flying Dutchman. Sparrow's debt is complicated by both Will Turner and Elizabeth Swann, who follow him out to sea.

Pirates of the Caribbean: At World's End (2007) 

Lord Beckett gains power over Davy Jones and, with the help of the Flying Dutchman, he is now executing his plans to extinguish piracy forever. To stand against the East India Trading Co., Will, Elizabeth, Barbossa, and the crew of the Black Pearl set out to rescue Captain Jack Sparrow from Davy Jones' Locker. As one of the Nine Pirate Lords, Jack is needed in order to release an ancient goddess with the power to defeat Beckett's forces.

Pirates of the Caribbean: On Stranger Tides (2011) 

Captain Jack Sparrow is on a quest to find the fabled Fountain of Youth and crosses paths with a former lover, Angelica. She forces Jack aboard the Queen Anne's Revenge, a ship captained by the infamous pirate Blackbeard, Angelica's father. Both are also in search of the Fountain: Angelica to save her father's soul, Blackbeard to escape a prophecy of his demise at the hands of a one-legged man. Joining the hunt is former pirate captain Barbossa, now a privateer in King George II's Navy, who is in a race against the Spanish for the Fountain of Youth.

Pirates of the Caribbean: Dead Men Tell No Tales (2017) 

A group of ghostly Spanish Royal Navy soldiers led by Jack Sparrow's old nemesis, Captain Armando Salazar, escape from the Devil's Triangle, with the goal of killing every pirate at sea, including Sparrow. To survive, Sparrow seeks out the legendary Trident of Poseidon, a powerful artifact whose owner can control the seas, tides, and aquatic animals, and break curses. The film was released in many countries as Pirates of the Caribbean: Salazar's Revenge.

Upcoming films

Untitled sixth film (TBA)
Shortly before the release of On Stranger Tides, it was reported that Disney was planning to shoot the fifth and the sixth films back-to-back, although ultimately only the fifth installment was developed. By March 2017, director Joachim Rønning stated that Dead Men Tell No Tales was only the beginning of the final adventure, confirming that it would not be the last film of the series. That September, producer Jerry Bruckheimer indicated that another Pirates of the Caribbean was still in development.

In October of the same year, Kaya Scodelario stated that she was contractually signed to return for a sixth film. Shortly after, it was confirmed that Rønning will direct the film. Disney announced that Craig Mazin and Ted Elliott will write Pirates of the Caribbean 6. In May 2020, Bruckheimer commented that the first draft of the screenplay for the sixth film would soon be finished. On April 20, 2022, during his defamation trial against ex-wife Amber Heard, Depp stated he was not interested in working on another Pirates of the Caribbean film, citing his strained relationship with Disney after they had removed him from the franchise before a verdict was reached in the case.

In February 2023, Orlando Bloom had expressed interest in returning to the franchise. On March, Keira Knightley explained to Entertainment Tonight why she wouldn't make a return to the Disney franchise. "What about Elizabeth Swan?" Knightley joked when asked if she would re-join the crew. "I mean, she sailed away so nicely. She sailed away in brilliant style." Jerry Bruckheimer also comments about potentially bringing back Johnny Depp's Jack Sparrow to the saga.

Spin-off films 
A female-led spin-off was announced in June 2020, starring Margot Robbie with Christina Hodson writing the screenplay. The film is separate from the sixth film also being developed. Bruckheimer was attached as producer. In November 2022, Robbie said the project was not going forward. Bruckheimer then shared the following month that the project wasn't officially dead and that a sequel merely took priority. He then later reiterated that it will still be made and has a "very strong story" but also needs "a little more work".

In an interview with The Hollywood Reporter, Jerry Bruckheimer stated that another spin-off "with a younger cast" is in the works alongside the Margot Robbie spin-off.

Short film

Tales of the Code: Wedlocked (2011) 
Serves as a prequel to The Curse of the Black Pearl, inspired by the auction scene in the Disneyland attraction. Two wenches believe they are both betrothed to Jack Sparrow, but he has secretly traded them to the auctioneer for a fancy hat. They think the auctioneer is raising money for them, when in actuality they are being sold as brides to the highest bidder. Wedlocked had several Pirates veterans reprise their roles, like Vanessa Branch as Giselle, Lauren Maher as Scarlett, and David Bailie reprising his role as Cotton. The 10 minute short also featured John Vickery as the auctioneer and Dale Dickey as Oona the wench, as well as three pirates—Marquis D’avis, Atencio, and Slurry Gibson—who are named after Marc Davis, Xavier Atencio, and Blaine Gibson, the Imagineers who worked on the original attraction.

The live-action short was directed by James Ward Byrkit, and was only included as a special feature in the US 15-disc 3D Blu-ray/2D Blu-ray/DVD + Digital Copy box set that includes the first four films released on October 18, 2011. It was also released in the similar UK five-disc set.

Byrkit conceived the idea for the project while on sets Rick Heinrichs designed for Pirates of the Caribbean: Dead Man's Chest (2006) and Pirates of the Caribbean: At World's End (2007). As the pirate cove sets from the feature films—where the short film takes place—were set to be demolished, the short project was prepped in a matter of days and shot over three days. Byrkit based the short film on the Pirate Code Book as it was a device that could tie into other stories later.

Cast and crew

Cast

Additional crew

Production

Development

First film 
In the early 1990s screenwriters Ted Elliott and Terry Rossio conceived a supernatural spin on the pirate genre after completing work on Aladdin, but there was no interest from any studio. Undeterred, the writing team refused to give up the dream, waiting for a studio to pick up their take on a pirate tale. Disney had Jay Wolpert write a script based on the Pirates of the Caribbean, which producer Jerry Bruckheimer rejected, feeling it was "a straight pirate movie". Bruckheimer brought Stuart Beattie in to rewrite the script in March 2002, due to his knowledge of piracy, and later that month Elliott and Rossio were brought in. Elliott and Rossio, inspired by the opening narration of the Pirates of the Caribbean ride, decided to give the film a supernatural edge. As the budget rose, Michael Eisner and Robert Iger threatened to cancel the film, though Bruckheimer changed their minds when he showed them concept art and animatics.

In June 2002, Gore Verbinski signed on to direct The Curse of the Black Pearl, and Johnny Depp and Geoffrey Rush signed on the following month to star. Verbinski was attracted to the idea of using modern technology to resurrect a genre, one that had disappeared after the Golden Age of Hollywood, and recalled his childhood memories of the ride, feeling the film was an opportunity to pay tribute to the "scary and funny" tone of it. Depp was attracted to the story as he found it quirky: rather than trying to find treasure, the crew of the Black Pearl were trying to return it in order to lift their curse; also, the traditional mutiny had already taken place. Verbinski approached Rush for the role of Barbossa, as he knew he would not play it with attempts at complexity, but with a simple villainy that would suit the story's tone. Orlando Bloom read the script after Rush, with whom he was working on Ned Kelly, suggested it to him. Keira Knightley came as a surprise to Verbinski: he had not seen her performance in Bend It Like Beckham and was impressed by her audition. Tom Wilkinson was negotiated with to play Governor Swann, but the role went to Jonathan Pryce, whom Depp idolized.

Shooting for The Curse of the Black Pearl began on October 9, 2002 and wrapped by March 7, 2003. Before its release, many executives and journalists had expected the film to flop, as the pirate genre had not been successful for years, the film was based on a theme-park ride, and Depp rarely made a big film. However, The Curse of the Black Pearl became both a critical and commercial success.

Second and third films 
After seeing how well the first film was made, the cast and crew signed for two sequels to be shot back-to-back, a practical decision on Disney's part to allow more time with the same cast and crew. Writers Ted Elliott and Terry Rossio knew that with an ensemble cast, they weren't free to invent totally different situations and characters, as with the Indiana Jones and James Bond series, and so had to retroactively turn The Curse of the Black Pearl into the first of a trilogy. They wanted to explore the reality of what would happen after Will Turner and Elizabeth Swann's embrace at the end of the first film, and initially considered the Fountain of Youth as the plot device. They settled on introducing Davy Jones, the Flying Dutchman and the Kraken, a mythology mentioned twice in the first film. They introduced a fictionalized East India Trading Company as the primary antagonists (being only mentioned in the first film), which for them represented a counterpoint to the personal freedom represented by pirates.

Filming for the sequels began on February 28, 2005, with Dead Man's Chest finishing on March 1, 2006, and At World's End on January 10, 2007. The second film was also the first Disney theatrical feature film with the computer-generated Walt Disney Pictures logo.

Fourth film 
Rossio and Elliot discovered the novel On Stranger Tides during production of Dead Man's Chest and At World's End and decided to use it as the basis for a fourth film.  As Gore Verbinski was unavailable, Bruckheimer invited Rob Marshall to direct the film. Elliott and Rossio decided to do a stand-alone film, with a story that would support new characters, and incorporate elements from the novel, such as Edward "Blackbeard" Teach, the Fountain of Youth and mermaids—the latter two having been already alluded to in the previous films. Depp, Rush, Kevin McNally, Greg Ellis, Damian O'Hare returned to their roles, and the cast saw the additions of Ian McShane as Blackbeard and Penélope Cruz as Angelica, Blackbeard's daughter and Jack Sparrow's love interest. A further addition was Richard Griffiths as King George II of Great Britain. After the costly production of two simultaneous films, Disney tried to scale down the fourth installment, giving a lower budget, which led to cheaper locations and fewer scenes with special effects. However, with a budget of $378.5 million, On Stranger Tides holds the record for most expensive film ever made.

Filming for On Stranger Tides began on June 14, and ended on November 19, 2010. It was also filmed in 3D, with cameras similar to the ones used in Avatar.

It was released in the United States on May 20, 2011.

Fifth film 
Terry Rossio was confirmed to write the screenplay for the fifth installment in January 2011, without his co-writer Ted Elliott. Jeff Nathanson signed on to write the script for the film in January 2013. Norwegian directors Joachim Rønning and Espen Sandberg were selected to direct on May 29 the same year. The film's title of the fifth film would be Dead Men Tell No Tales, alluding to the line well known from the Pirates of the Caribbean theme-park attraction. The film was given an alternative title, Salazar's Revenge, in selected European, South American, and Asian countries for marketing purposes. They confirmed their involvement, and praised Jeff Nathanson's "funny and touching" script, also being inspired by the first film of the franchise. Disney pushed back the film's initial 2015 release, with sources indicating that a Summer 2016 release was likely. Producer Jerry Bruckheimer revealed that script issues were behind the delay and that Jeff Nathanson was at work on a second attempt based on a well-received outline.

A spokesman for the Australian Arts Minister confirmed that the fifth installment was set to shoot in Australia after the government agreed to repurpose $20 million of tax incentives originally intended for the remake of 20,000 Leagues Under the Sea. Disney and Ian Walker the Queensland Arts Minister, confirmed in October 2014, that filming was expected to start in February 2015, and that it would take place exclusively in Australia, as the largest production to ever shoot in the country. Village Roadshow Studios and Port Douglas were officially confirmed as filming locations. Production began in Australia on February 17, 2015, and wrapped on July 9.

While Disney originally announced a release date for July 7, 2017, Dead Men Tell No Tales was released on May 26, 2017.

Reception

Box office performance 

The Pirates of the Caribbean film series was successful at the box office, with each film grossing over $650 million, and all but Dead Men Tell No Tales at some point ranking among the fifty highest-grossing films of all time. It also became the first ever series to have multiple films passing the billion dollar mark in box office revenues with Dead Man's Chest and On Stranger Tides, since followed by other film franchises.

The Curse of the Black Pearl was the third-highest-grossing 2003 film in North America (behind The Lord of the Rings: The Return of the King and Finding Nemo) and fourth worldwide (behind The Return of the King, Finding Nemo and The Matrix Reloaded). Dead Man's Chest was the most successful film of 2006 worldwide, and At World's End led the worldwide grosses in 2007, though being only fourth in North America (behind Spider-Man 3, Shrek the Third and Transformers). On Stranger Tides was the third-highest-grossing film of 2011 worldwide (behind Harry Potter and the Deathly Hallows – Part 2 and Transformers: Dark of the Moon) and the fifth in North America. The first three sequels broke box office records upon release, of which the most notable are the opening-weekend record in North America (Dead Man's Chest), the Memorial-Day weekend record in North America (At World's End) and the opening-weekend record outside North America (On Stranger Tides).

Critical and public response 

The series is noted for its high quality of acting talent. The visual and practical effects are considered some of the best ever done on film, so much so that audiences believed certain CGI elements of the films were real and done practically. However, the plots of the four sequels have received mixed reviews, with the general consensus that they are too bloated and convoluted to follow. Pirates of the Caribbean is noted for reinvigorating the pirate film genre after decades of either no pirate films or failed pirate films. The success of the series saw Disney and Jerry Bruckheimer try to replicate the franchise's success by releasing other big budget adventure films such as Prince of Persia: The Sands of Time and The Lone Ranger, the latter of which was directed by Gore Verbinski. Both of them have failed to achieve critical or financial success.

Accolades

Academy Awards 
Together, the first three films were nominated for a total of 11 Academy Awards, of which a single award was won.

Golden Globe Awards 
Together, all the four films were nominated for a total of 2 Golden Globe Awards, of which neither were won.

Golden Raspberry Awards

MTV Movie Awards 
Together, all the first three films were nominated for a total of 13 MTV Movie Awards, of which 4 were won.

Teen Choice Awards 
Together, the first four films were nominated for a total of 32 Teen Choice Awards, of which 17 were won.

Music

Soundtracks

See also

 List of Pirates of the Caribbean cast members

Notes

References

External links 
 

 
Film series introduced in 2003
Fiction set in the 18th century
Adventure film series
Comedy film series
Action film series
Disney film series